Remote Luxury is the first compilation album by the Australian psychedelic rock band The Church, released in 1984. The band had recently signed to Warner Bros. in the United States and their new label decided to re-release the band's most recent Australian material, the Persia and Remote Luxury EPs, as an album with a new running order. They also released "Constant In Opal" as a single in the US. The version of "No Explanation" included here has a 20-second instrumental jam at the beginning.

The album was re-released on CD by Arista Records in 1990, but has since been deleted, and it was re-released in 1988 on LP by carrere records, under the label RGE in Brazil.

In 2001, EMI Australia released the compilation album Sing-Songs//Remote Luxury//Persia, which contained remastered versions of all the tracks from the EPs in their original running order.

Track listing
 "Constant in Opal" (Kilbey)
 "Violet Town" (Kilbey)
 "No Explanation" (Kilbey)
 "10,000 Miles" (Kilbey/Willson-Piper)
 "Maybe These Boys..." (Kilbey)
 "Into My Hands" (Kilbey)
 "A Month of Sundays" (Kilbey)
 "Volumes" (Willson-Piper)
 "Shadow Cabinet" (Kilbey/Koppes/Ploog/Willson-Piper)
 "Remote Luxury" (Kilbey)

Personnel
Steve Kilbey - bass, lead vocals (1-3, 5-7, 9), keyboards
Peter Koppes - guitars, backing vocals
Marty Willson-Piper - guitars, backing and lead (4, 8) vocals
Richard Ploog - drums, percussion
Additional keyboards by Craig Hooper and David Moor

References

1984 albums
The Church (band) albums
Psychedelic music albums by Australian artists